785 Zwetana is a minor planet orbiting the Sun that was discovered by Adam Massinger, an assistant at the Heidelberg Observatory, on March 30, 1914. It was named for the daughter of Kiril Popoff, a Bulgarian astronomer. The orbital plane is inclined by an angle of 12.8° to the plane of the ecliptic.

The near infrared spectra suggests the presence of spinel on the surface, which is indicative of calcium–aluminium-rich inclusions. The best meteorite analog to the near infrared spectrum of this object is the enstatite chondrite, Abee.

This is consistent with other published results.

References

External links 
 
 

000785
Discoveries by Adam Massinger
Named minor planets
000785
000785
19140330